The Pharmacist is a 1933 American pre-Code comedy film directed by Arthur Ripley and starring W. C. Fields.

Cast
W.C. Fields as Mr. Dilweg
Marjorie Kane as Priscilla Dilweg
Elise Cavanna as Mrs. Grace Dilweg
Grady Sutton as Cuthbert Smith
Lorena Carr as Ooleota Dilweg

Reception
On review aggregator website Rotten Tomatoes, the film holds 100% approval rating based on 5 reviews, with an average rating of 7.3/10.

References

External links

 The two versions of The Pharmacist at Internet Archive contain only reel 1 of the 2-reel short (as of 15 June 2018).

1933 comedy films
1933 short films
American black-and-white films
Mack Sennett Comedies short films
Films directed by Arthur Ripley
Films with screenplays by W. C. Fields
American comedy short films
1930s American films